Alexandrea Borstein (born February 15, 1971) is an American actress, comedian, writer and producer. Borstein voices Lois Griffin on the animated comedy television series Family Guy (1999–present), and won a Primetime Emmy Award for the role. She gained acclaim for starring as Susie Myerson in the comedy-drama series The Marvelous Mrs. Maisel (2017–present), which has earned her two Primetime Emmy Awards.

Borstein also had lead roles as various characters on the sketch comedy series MADtv (1997–2009), as well as Dawn Forchette in the medical comedy series Getting On (2013–2015). She had supporting roles in numerous films, including The Lizzie McGuire Movie, Catwoman (2004), Good Night, and Good Luck (2005), The Lookout (2007), Dinner for Schmucks (2010), Ted (2012), ParaNorman (2012), and A Million Ways to Die in the West (2014).

Borstein spent her childhood in Deerfield, Illinois, a suburb of Chicago, before moving with her family to Northridge, California, a neighborhood of Los Angeles. She graduated from Chatsworth High School in 1989. Borstein is a graduate of San Francisco State University, where she studied rhetoric. She was trained in improvisational comedy at the ACME Comedy Theatre, near Hollywood, California, and was selected to join the cast of MADtv after being scouted by talent agents. Borstein was also a writer and voice actor for several television shows, including Casper, Pinky and the Brain, and Power Rangers Zeo before joining the cast of MADtv in 1997 as a featured player. She became a repertory player mid-season.

Early life
Borstein was born in Highland Park, Illinois, a city north of Chicago. She was raised in Deerfield, Illinois, before her family moved to California. Borstein has two older brothers. Her parents, Irv and Judy Borstein, are both mental health professionals. Borstein has stated that she is of Hungarian and Mongolian descent. Borstein is Jewish.

Her father is from Atlanta. Her maternal grandmother, a Holocaust survivor, was born and raised in Budapest, Hungary and immigrated to the United States after the Hungarian Revolution of 1956. Borstein attended San Francisco State University.

Career

1993–1998: Career beginnings and MADtv
Borstein trained in improv at the ACME Comedy Theater, where she met her writing partner and future husband Jackson Douglas. Shortly after they began working together on the animated series Casper and Pinky and the Brain, Borstein left her position at an ad agency – where she had written print ads for Barbie – to become a full-time writer. In 1996, while still writing for Casper, Borstein worked on the show Power Rangers Zeo as the voice of Queen Machina, the queen of the Machine Empire.

In 1997, Borstein became a cast member on the third season of the sketch comedy show MADtv. She originally joined the cast as a featured player, but was upgraded to the repertory mid-season.

Borstein was best known on MADtv for her character Ms. Swan (owner of the Gorgeous Pretty Beauty Nail Salon); her other recurring characters included Eracist Anne, "Stick Chick" Echo, singer Jasmine Wayne-Wayne, child prodigy Karen Goddard, lounge singer Shaunda, News at Six outside-the-studio reporter Sue Napersville, and Cordo the GAP troll. When Seth Green made recurring appearances on the show as mean boss Mr. Brightling, Borstein would play his mother, Mama Brightling.

1999–2009: Further success and Family Guy

While working on MADtv, Borstein met Seth MacFarlane, who was then preparing to launch the animated sitcom Family Guy on FOX. MacFarlane was originally supposed to create animated shorts for MADtv, but declined in favor of creating an independent series. MacFarlane cast Borstein as the voice of character Lois Griffin. After the show's debut in January 1999, Family Guy was cancelled by the network in 2002, but returned in 2005. As well as her role as the voice performer for Lois and several other characters (including a brief appearance as Ms. Swan in a 2005 episode), she is also a producer and staff writer. She was nominated for a Primetime Emmy Award for Outstanding Voice-Over Performance for the episode "Lois Comes Out of Her Shell" in 2013.

In 2000, Borstein was cast as Sookie St. James in the WB drama Gilmore Girls. She portrayed Sookie in the pilot but her MADtv contract prevented her from continuing in the role. Borstein made recurring appearances on Gilmore Girls throughout the show's run, first as the harpist Drella and later as the stylist Miss Celine.

As a film actor, she played Ms. Ungermeyer the school principal in The Lizzie McGuire Movie (2003), the best friend of Halle Berry's character in Catwoman (2004), and an employee at CBS News in Good Night, and Good Luck (2005). She also had a small role in the movie Bad Santa (2003) and an uncredited cameo as an obnoxious coffee shop patron in the Will Ferrell movie Kicking & Screaming (2005). On some commercials, she sometimes voices Olive Oyl from Popeye and Betty Boop.

Borstein was a co-host of GSN's Celebrity Blackjack in 2004. She made at least three guest appearances, once as Lois Griffin, on the Comedy Central animated program Drawn Together.

Borstein was cast as a press secretary in the 2007 sitcom pilot The Thick of It, but the series was not picked up for broadcast. She was seen in the 2009 comedy For Christ's Sake, which was directed by her then husband Jackson Douglas.

Borstein's production company is called Crackerpants, Inc. In 2007, it released the DVD Drop Dead Gorgeous (in a Down-to-Earth Bombshell Sort of Way), a recording of a live performance at the Alex Theatre with Teddy Towne as the opening act. The title comes from one of many female character breakdowns Borstein reads from to illustrate sexism in the industry.

2010–present: Getting On and The Marvelous Mrs. Maisel

Borstein has made several supporting appearances in such comedic films as Killers (2010), Dinner for Schmucks (2010), Ted (2012), ParaNorman (2012), A Million Ways to Die in the West (2014), and The Angry Birds Movie (2016).

In 2010, Borstein joined the first season staff of the Showtime comedy-drama series Shameless, as a writer and supervising producer. In its second season, she held the position of writer and consulting producer. She also guest-starred as Lou Deckner in numerous episodes of the series, beginning in the first-season episode "But at Last Came a Knock."

She also appeared as a comedian contestant on IFC's short-lived comedy-driven game show Bunk in 2012.

Borstein starred as Dawn Forchette on the HBO comedy series Getting On, which is a remake of a UK series with the same name. The series has gained positive reviews and earned multiple Primetime Emmy Award nominations. It aired from 2013 to 2015.

In 2017, Borstein began starring as Susie Myerson in the historical comedy-drama series The Marvelous Mrs. Maisel, for which she received significant critical acclaim and won two Primetime Emmy Awards for Outstanding Supporting Actress in a Comedy Series.

Personal life
Borstein met actor and writer Jackson Douglas while she was studying improv at the ACME Comedy Theatre. Douglas proposed to her during the taping of a MADtv skit and they were married in 1999. Douglas filed for divorce in October 2014 and it was finalized in 2017.

Borstein was pregnant while she recorded the DVD commentary for the Family Guy episode "Stewie Kills Lois"; she joked about naming her baby Stewie. She and Douglas have a son and a daughter.

Borstein is a longtime advocate for the National Hemophilia Foundation.

Filmography

Film

Television

Video games

Web

Radio

Awards and nominations

References

External links

 
 SuicideGirls interview with Alex Borstein

1971 births
Living people
Actresses from Chicago
American film actresses
American sketch comedians
American people of Hungarian-Jewish descent
American people of Mongolian descent
American television actresses
American television writers
American voice actresses
American women comedians
American women television writers
Comedians from California
Comedians from Illinois
Jewish American actresses
Jewish American female comedians
Jewish American writers
Outstanding Performance by a Supporting Actress in a Comedy Series Primetime Emmy Award winners
People from Highland Park, Illinois
San Francisco State University alumni
Screenwriters from Illinois
Writers from Chicago
21st-century American actresses
21st-century American comedians
21st-century American screenwriters
People from Deerfield, Illinois
21st-century American Jews